DIY is a United Kingdom-based music publication, in print and online. Its free print edition is released monthly with a physical circulation of 40,000 in UK venues, clubs and shops.

DIY Magazine

DIY was launched in 2002 by then-editor Stephen Ackroyd & Emma Swann as an online-only publication called This Is Fake DIY, named after a song by Scottish indie pop band Bis and staffed largely by a freelance writing team from around the globe. The website features news, reviews and features.

In September 2007, DIY was nominated for Best Music Magazine at the annual BT Digital Music Awards, where it was described as "a great mix of humour and pop culture that has become the envy of the internet."

In April 2011, DIY started a free monthly music magazine. Cover acts have included Paramore, Mumford and Sons, Biffy Clyro, Jamie xx, Years & Years, Wolf Alice, LCD Soundsystem, Fall Out Boy, and Bastille (full list below).

On 11 March 2013, DIY started a weekly magazine in addition to the print title, published via tablet computer and iPhone - this was later pulled in favour of limited edition, one-off titles. Superfood and METZ have both released limited edition 'zines' in collaboration with DIY as part of this.

In June 2014, DIY rebranded, dropping the "This Is Fake" and launching its new URL - diymag.com.

DIY Presents
DIY also host live shows across the UK under the name DIY Presents.

Every year, they host a run of shows under the Hello moniker, previewing new acts at London's The Old Blue Last. Previous acts to play at DIY's Hello shows include Wolf Alice, Girl Band and Spring King.

October 2014 saw DIY team up with PledgeMusic for the first UK-wide DIY Presents tour, culminating in an all-dayer held at London venue The Laundry on 1 November. The tour was opened by local acts, as picked via fan-vote, and headlined by Shy Nature and Flyte. The all-dayer was headlined by JAWS, and featured Menace Beach, Spring King, Hinds and many more.

In the autumn of 2015, DIY's new music arm Neu hosted the DIY Presents Neu Tour 2015, which saw VANT, The Big Moon and Inheaven tour the country, culmating in a London date at Camden's Dingwalls.

List of DIY cover stars

 Spring 2011: Noah and the Whale
 Summer 2011: Two Door Cinema Club
 Autumn 2011: Bombay Bicycle Club
 Winter 2011: The Maccabees
 April 2012: You Me At Six
 May 2012: DZ Deathrays
 June 2012: Hot Chip
 July 2012: Icona Pop
 August 2012: Alt-J
 September 2012: LCD Soundsystem
 October 2012: The Killers
 November 2012: Grimes, Fucked Up, Japandroids
 December 2012 / January 2013: Peace, Palma Violets, Aluna George
 February 2013: Biffy Clyro
 March 2013: Bastille
 April 2013: Fall Out Boy
 May 2013: Little Boots
 June 2013: The National
 July 2013: Deap Vally
 August 2013: Reading & Leeds Festival
 September 2013: CHVRCHES
 October 2013: Paramore
 November 2013: Foals
 December 2013 / January 2014: Class Of 2014 (Chloe Howl)
 February 2014: Warpaint
 March 2014: St. Vincent
 April 2014: Sky Ferreira
 May 2014: The Horrors
 June 2014: Wolf Alice, Peace, Jungle
 July 2014: Röyksopp and Robyn
 August 2014: Gerard Way
 September 2014: Alt-J
 October 2014: Charli XCX
 November 2014: Bastille
 December 2014 / January 2015: Class Of 2015 (Years & Years)
 February 2015: Sleater-Kinney
 March 2015: Laura Marling
 April 2015: Marina and the Diamonds
 Festival Guide 2015: Slaves
 May 2015: Mumford and Sons
 June 2015: Jamie xx
 July 2015: Wolf Alice
 August 2015: The Maccabees
 September 2015: Foals
 October 2015: CHVRCHES
 November 2015: Hinds
 December 2015/January 2016: Rat Boy
 February 2016: Savages
 March 2016: Grimes
 April 2016: Wolf Alice
 May 2016: The Kills
 June 2016: Bastille
 July 2016: MØ
 August 2016: Wild Beasts
 September 2016: Two Door Cinema Club
 October 2016: Honeyblood
 November 2016: Tame Impala
 December 2016 / January 2017: Class Of 2017 (Loyle Carner)
 February 2017: Run the Jewels
 March 2017: Circa Waves
 April 2017: The Big Moon
 Festival Guide 2017: Mac DeMarco
 May 2017: Paramore
 June 2017: Royal Blood
 July 2017: Haim
 August 2017: Kasabian
 September 2017: Wolf Alice
 October 2017: St. Vincent
 November 2017: Brandon Flowers
 December 2017 / January 2018: Pale Waves
 February 2018: The Vaccines
 March 2018: The Magic Gang
 April 2018: CHVRCHES
 May 2018: Years & Years
 June 2018: The 1975
 July 2018: Black Honey
 August 2018: Slaves
 September 2018: Christine and the Queens
 October 2018: Robyn
 November 2018: Shame
 December 2018 / January 2019: Sports Team, whenyoung, Amyl and The Sniffers
 February 2019: Sundara Karma
March 2019: Foals
April 2019: Hayden Thorpe
May 2019: Slowthai
June 2019: Vampire Weekend
July 2019: Marika Hackman
August 2019: Sleater-Kinney
September 2019: Metronomy
October 2019: Iggy Pop
November 2019: The 1975
December 2019 / January 2020: Dry Cleaning
February 2020: Tame Impala
March 2020: Rina Sawayama
April 2020: Biffy Clyro
May 2020: Mike Skinner
June 2020: Phoebe Bridgers
July 2020 (1): Fontaines DC
July 2020 (2): Glass Animals
August 2020: Angel Olsen
September 2020: Idles
October 2020: Beabadoobee
November 2020: Gorillaz
December 2020-January 2021: Ashnikko
February 2021 (1): Pale Waves
February 2021 (2): Rico Nasty
February 2021 (3): Goat Girl
February 2021 (4): Slowthai
March 2021: Zara Larsson
April 2021: St. Vincent
May 2021: Easy Life
June 2021: Wolf Alice

This Is Fake DIY Records

In 2007 DIY started a record label. Its roster included Duels, Heads We Dance, Manda Rin, Model Horror, Love Ends Disaster!, Popular Workshop, The Research, The Victorian English Gentlemens Club, We Are The Physics and You Animals.

References

External links
 

2002 establishments in the United Kingdom
Monthly magazines published in the United Kingdom
Music magazines published in the United Kingdom
Internet properties established in 2002
Magazines established in 2011
Free magazines